This is a list of burn centres in Bahrain. A burn centre or burn care facility is typically a hospital ward which specializes in the treatment of severe burn injuries.

In 1980, the need for a dedicated burns unit in Bahrain was highlighted in the local medical literature after significant incidents of burns, commonly scalding injuries in children, were identified.

Hospitals
Salmaniya Medical Complex – Bahrain's first burns unit was established in Salmaniya Medical Complex in 1984, relieving the burden on general surgical wards. A study in 1993 calculated more than 1600 admitted burns patients since its establishment, with over half belonging to the paediatric population and another significant portion being young migrant labourers.
Bahrain Royal Medical Services
KIMS Bahrain Medical Centre

See also
Health in Bahrain

References

Health in Bahrain
Burns